Pony Creek is a stream in Scotland County in the U.S. state of Missouri. It is a tributary of the North Fork North Fabius River.

Pony Creek most likely was named for the fact local Indians owned ponies.

See also
List of rivers of Missouri

References

Rivers of Scotland County, Missouri
Rivers of Missouri